"Everyday" is a song by American singer Ariana Grande featuring fellow American singer and rapper Future, from the former's third studio album, Dangerous Woman. The song was written by the artists alongside Savan Kotecha and producer Ilya. "Everyday" was premiered on Beats 1 in May 2016, as part of a countdown a week ahead of the release of the album. On January 10, 2017, the single was serviced to rhythmic contemporary playlists, and sent to contemporary hit radio on February 14, 2017, serving as the fourth and final single from the album.

"Everyday" is a woozy electropop and trap song built around a grinding beat and a thrumming bassline. One of Grande's more lyrically explicit songs, the lyrics speak of sexual satisfaction. The track received mixed reviews from music critics who appreciated its production, but they were neutral towards Future's feature. Commercially, "Everyday" charted in multiple territories, failing to enter the top 30 in any of them.

The song's accompanying music video was released on February 27, 2017, on Vevo, directed by Chris Marrs Piliero. Grande promoted the song with live performances during her second world tour, the Dangerous Woman Tour. The song charted within the top forty in Belgium and the UK R&B Chart, and was later certified Platinum in the United States, Canada, and Brazil.

Background and release
"Everyday" was written by Savan Kotecha, Ilya, Grande and Future, and produced by Ilya and Max Martin. It was recorded in 2015 at MXM Studios and Wolf Cousins Studios in Stockholm. Regarding the collaboration, Grande said in an interview for KIIS FM: "I knew I wanted to work with Future, but I didn't know if we could find the right song to do together because we're so different, but we found a dope vibe and it's very unique and exciting."

Grande premiered "Everyday" on Beats 1 on May 13, 2016, a week ahead of the release of Dangerous Woman. The singer announced the song as the album's fourth single on January 3, 2017. The single was serviced to rhythmic contemporary playlists in the US on January 10, 2017. A challenge for Grande's fans was announced by the singer on Twitter on January 30, 2017, where they had to unlock the lyric video for "Everyday" by accumulating enough save and stream data for the song on Spotify. In her tweet, Grande provided a link to her website where fans could track the challenge's progress meter. The lyric video was unlocked on Vevo on February 1, 2017. Directed by Chris Marrs Piliero, it features Grande dancing and singing in front of a row of spotlights. Future is absent from the video, though Grande is shown lip syncing his verse. "Everyday" impacted contemporary hit radio in the US on February 14, 2017.

Composition

"Everyday" is a woozy electropop, R&B, and trap song. The music is built around a grinding, tinned dance beat and a thrumming side-chained groovy bassline. Other instruments include keys, percussion and guitars. The song opens with Grande singing, "Anytime I'm alone, I can't help thinking about you," accompanied by an R&B-pop production comprising swirling synths. A hollowed-out bridge sung by Grande features before each chorus. The pounding EDM chorus is elevated by Future warbling the song's hook in a warped, woozy style while Grande harmonizes around him. As opposed to using her higher vocal register, Grande instead sings in a content sighing style.

The song's lyrics are explicit and a paean to the ecstasy of sex. Grande illustrates a steamy love affair and lathers on flirtation. During his verse, Future raps about lavish vacations and late-night endeavors, describing himself as a bad guy ideally suited to Grande's needs.

Critical reception
In a positive response, Joey Nolfi of Entertainment Weekly deemed the track a "rhythmic banger" and appreciated Grande's "smoldering vocals". Michael Cragg of The Observer found the song pulsating. Jenna Romaine of Billboard magazine said it was a "fun, bopping song", while Taylor Weatherby from the same publication viewed it among Grande's strong collaborations, noting that it had "greatness". AllMusic's Stephen Thomas Erlewine described "Everyday" as "a heavy thrumming jam". Annie Zaleski of The A.V. Club called the track "a trap-pop gem" and an example of Grande sounding "far more confident tackling Dangerous Womans diffuse genres." Brennan Carley from Spin magazine complimented the song's "neatly-measured hook".  Complex magazine writer Chris Mench said, "With Grande going for a more mature sound on this album, 'Everyday' actually seems to fit the aesthetic pretty well. It's dance beat and explicit lyrics seem ready to grab the attention of old fans as well as make an impact on the radio."

In a less enthusiastic review, Nathan Wisnicki from Pretty Much Amazing was critical of Grande's "lack of interesting inflection", but felt Future's feature saved an otherwise "pretty generic song". Quinn Moreland from Pitchfork Media dismissed Future's repetition of the song's hook, and also said that without the rapper's verse "it would be immediately obvious that 'Everyday' is constructed atop a pile of hot fluff." In a review of Dangerous Woman, Ross Scarano of Complex said "Everyday" and "Greedy" failed to match "the consistent highs" of Grande's 2014 album My Everything. Chris Kelly of Fact magazine wrote that the song wasted Future's feature. Rolling Stones Christopher R. Weingarten derided the track as "something where Future sings a chorus that is one word", and cited it as an example of Grande being "prone to a schizophrenic sound and unfortunate sequencing". Theon Weber of Spin regarded the track as a "rote 2016 obligation" and "executive-mandated bagginess". Sputnikmusic viewed "Everyday" as "a real travesty", writing that "in addition to possessing awful lyrics, it is also simple to a fault."

Commercial performance
After the release of Dangerous Woman, "Everyday" debuted at number 23 on the Bubbling Under Hot 100 chart for the week dated June 11, 2016 due to digital downloads. Following the release of its music video, "Everyday" debuted at number 85 on the US Billboard Hot 100 issue dated March 4, 2017, moving up to number 78 the following week. After five weeks present on the chart, the song reached a peak of number 55 on the week dated April 1, 2017, and became her second-lowest charting single in the country, after "Right There" in 2013. The song fared better on the airplay charts, where it peaked at numbers 18 and 13 on the Billboard Mainstream Top 40 and Rhythmic charts, respectively. Similarly, it debuted at number 98 and reached a peak of number 54 the following week on the Canadian Hot 100 on the issue dated March 11, 2017, spending a total of ten weeks charting.

In Australia, "Everyday" peaked at number ninety-six on the Australian Singles Chart. Despite being her second lowest-charting entry in the United Kingdom, only reaching number 123 on the UK Singles Chart, "Everyday" performed better on the UK R&B Chart where it attained a top-forty peak of number 35.

Music video 
A challenge for Grande's fans was announced by the singer on Twitter on January 30, 2017, where they had to unlock the lyric video for "Everyday" by accumulating enough save and stream data for the song on Spotify. The lyric video for "Everyday" was unlocked on Grande's official Vevo channel on February 1, 2017. It features Grande dancing and singing in front of a row of spotlights, while wearing a black bra, an oversized Karl Kani down jacket, and her hair in a half up-down style with two small space buns. Future is absent from the lyric video, and Grande is seen lip syncing his verse. The official music video was then released on February 27, 2017, also directed by Chris Marrs Piliero, who had previously directed the music videos for "Break Free" and "Santa Tell Me". The clip features Grande singing in the streets, in a laundromat and on a bus while couples of different races, ages and sexualites are kissing and beginning to touch each other intimately. Future raps his verse in an office surrounded by employees having sex. The video received praise from critics for its showcase of the LGBT community and people of different races, one of Grande's main topics of activism. Jenna Romaine of Billboard magazine found the video playful, and complimented Grande for appearing in it "as opposed to straight lyrics coming across the screen". The music video was broadcast in its original form on MTV Live with a TV-PG rating. As of February 2023, the lyric and music video respectively have a view count of over 222 million and over 167 million.

Live performances
Grande first performed "Everyday" as part of her album showcase for Vevo in New York on May 21, 2016. It was included on the setlist for Grande's 2017 Dangerous Woman Tour. "Everyday" was also performed at the iHeartRadio Festival 2016.

Credits and personnel
Credits adapted from Dangerous Womans liner notes.
Recording and management
 Recorded at MXM Studios and Wolf Cousins Studios (Stockholm, Sweden)
 Mixed at MixStar Studios (Virginia Beach, Virginia)
 Mastered at Sterling Sound (New York City, New York)
 Published by MXM — administered by Kobalt — (ASCAP), Wolf Cousins (STIM), Warner/Chappell Music Scand. (STIM) and Grandefinale LLC.
 Future appears courtesy of Epic Records.
Personnel

 Ariana Grande – vocals, backing vocals, songwriting
 Future – featured vocals, backing vocals, songwriting 
 Ilya –  production, songwriting, vocal production, programming, Keyboard, bass, percussion, backing vocals
 Savan Kotecha – songwriting, backing vocals
 Max Martin – vocal production
 Serban Ghenea – mixing
 Sam Holland – engineer
 John Hanes – mixing engineer
 Tom Coyne – mastering

 Aya Merrill – mastering
 Jeremy Lertola – guitars
 Wendy Goldstein – A&R
 Scooter Braun – A&R

Charts

Certifications

Release history

References

External links
 

2016 songs
2017 singles
Ariana Grande songs
Future (rapper) songs
Music videos directed by Chris Marrs Piliero
Republic Records singles
Song recordings produced by Ilya Salmanzadeh
Songs written by Ariana Grande
Songs written by Future (rapper)
Songs written by Ilya Salmanzadeh
Songs written by Savan Kotecha
Electropop songs